Abraham Mar Thoma XVII Metropolitan (30 October 1879 – 1 September 1947) was the Metropolitan of the Malankara Mar Thoma Syrian Church from 1944–1947. He was called Maret Kochu Thirumeni by his people. Among the bishops of Malankara Churches Including Mar Thoma Church, Abraham Mar Thoma was the first to earn a Doctoral degree.

Early life

Ninan was the son of Abraham. He married Mariamma, eldest daughter of Oommachen, Karikattu. Eraviperoor. Mariamma's mother was from Chemmarapallil, Puthupally, Kottayam.

Bishop Abraham was born on 30 October 1879, was the only son of Ninan and Mariamma. He had two elder sisters. His parents called him Kochavarachen. His school record shows his name as M. N. Abraham (Maret Ninan Abraham).

Education

He was not a bright student. Many times he failed in his school final and degree examinations. That helped him in later years to encourage the students who failed in their examinations and showed them the path to success.

Ordination
M. N. Abraham and M. P. Pothen (Philipose), Velliyampallil, Mallappally, were the first Indians with university degrees to be ordained as deacons in the Mar Thoma Church. Titus II Mar Thoma ordained them on 30 April 1912.

On 5 December 1914, at his native place Eraviperoor, Deacon Abraham, and Deacon Pothen were ordained as priests. Abraham was appointed as Kayamkulam divisional secretary.

Politics
The Metropolitan was a staunch nationalist who stood for the people's democratic rights. He resisted the undemocratic and dictatorial actions of Dewan Sir C. P. Ramaswami Iyer and was instrumental in getting a resolution passed by the Sabha Council (church council) condemning Sir C. P.'s move to proclaim Travancore as an independent state.

See also
Mar Thoma Church
Throne of St. Thomas
Marthoma Metrans
List of Malankara Metropolitans
Syrian Malabar Nasrani
Saint Thomas Christians
Christianity in India
List of Catholicoi of the East and Malankara Metropolitans
List of Syrian Malabar Nasranis

References

Bibliography
English
 Juhanon Marthoma Metropolitan. (1952). Christianity in India and a Brief History of the Marthoma Syrian Church. Pub: K.M. Cherian.
 Zac Varghese Dr. & Mathew A. Kallumpram. (2003). Glimpses of Mar Thoma Church History. London, England. .
 Zac Varghese Dr. & Mathew A. Kallumpram. Metropolitan Abraham Mar Thoma. "Light of Life", Vol. 3, Issue 11, September 2004.

Malayalam.
 Eapen, Prof. Dr. K. V. (2001). Malankara Marthoma Suryani Sabha Charitram (History of Malankara Marthoma Syrian Church). Pub: Kallettu, Muttambalam, Kottayam.
 Mar Thoma Voluntary Evangelistic Association, (1998). Abraham Mar Thoma
 Mathew, N. M. Malankara Marthoma Sabha Charitram (History of the Marthoma Church), Volume I (2006), Volume II (2007), Volume III (2008). Pub. E.J. Institute, Thiruvalla.
 Varghese, (1950) Dr. Abraham Mar Thoma Metropolitan.
 Daniel, K. N. Dr. Abraham Marthoma Metropolitan – Biography. V.V. Press, Kollam. 1948.

External links
http://marthomasyrianchurch.org
http://marthoma.in
Mar Thoma Sunday School, Kuwait at kuwaitmarthoma.com
Pallipad Mar Thoma

1879 births
1949 deaths
Christian clergy from Kerala
Metropolitans of the Mar Thoma Syrian Church
People from Alappuzha district
Saint Thomas Christians